{{chembox
| verifiedrevid = 422659402
| ImageFile_Ref = 
| ImageFile = 3,3'-Dichlorobenzidine.svg
| ImageSize = 250px
| PIN = 3,3′-Dichloro[1,1′-biphenyl]-4,4′-diamine
| Reference = 
| OtherNames = 4-(4-Amino-3-chlorophenyl)-2-chloroaniline4,4′-Diamino-3,3′-dichlorobiphenylo,''o-Dichlorobenzidine3,3′-Dichlorobiphenyl-4,4′-diamine3,3′-Dichloro-4,4′-biphenyldiamine3,3′-Dichloro-4,4′-diaminobiphenyl
|Section1=
|Section2=
|Section3=
}}3,3'-Dichlorobenzidine''' is an organic compound with the formula (C6H3Cl(NH2))2. The pure compound is pale yellow, but commercial samples are often colored. It is barely soluble in water and is often supplied as a wet paste. It is widely used in the production of diarylide yellow pigments used in the production of printing inks. Its use in the production of dyes has been largely discontinued because of concerns about carcinogenicity.

Preparation and reactions
3,3'-Dichlorobenzidine is prepared in two steps from 2-nitrochlorobenzene. The first step involves reduction with zinc in base to afford 2,2'-dichlorodiphenylhydrazine.  This intermediate undergoes the benzidine rearrangement to afford 3,3'-dichlorobenzidine.

Aqueous solutions of 3,3'-dichlorobenzidine degrade in light to monochloro derivative. It undergoes chlorination (for example in water treatment plants) to give the tetrachloro derivative.

The most widely practiced reaction of 3,3'-dichlorobenzidine is its double diazotization. This bis(diazo) intermediate is then coupled to derivatives of acetoacetylaminobenzene (CH3C(O)CH2C(O)NHAr).  In this way, the following commercial yellow pigments are produced: pigment Yellow 12, pigment Yellow 13, pigment Yellow 14, pigment Yellow 17 and pigment Yellow 83.

Safety
3,3'-Dichlorobenzidine is considered a carcinogen. This compound has been shown to increase the incidence of tumors in animals. Because it is structurally similar to benzidine, a known carcinogen, it is believed that it may share a similar mechanism in causing bladder cancer in humans.

References

External links
Spectrum Laboratories Chemical Fact Sheet
CDC - NIOSH Pocket Guide to Chemical Hazards

Chlorobenzenes
IARC Group 2B carcinogens
Anilines
Biphenyls